Jun Ray Song Chang is the third album and first compilation by experimental band Asa-Chang & Junray, released through The Leaf Label on September 17, 2002. It compiles their second album and most of their first one alongside two new tracks.

Track listing

Personnel
Asa-Chang - string arrangements, bongos, producing, trumpets, vocals
Shoukichi Kina - composing
Kiyoshi Kusaka - engineering, mixing, programming
Kazufumi Kodama - percussion, programming
Hidehiko Urayama - guitars, programming
Yoshimi P We - programming

References

2002 albums
Japanese-language albums
The Leaf Label albums